Huvudskär is a Swedish archipelago, consisting of about 200 rocks and islands, and a lighthouse. It is located in the Baltic Sea, in the southern part of the Stockholm archipelago. For many hundred years this area was very important for fishermen. Huvudskär is a very popular destination for sea travellers and tourists.

The lighthouse
In 1882 the first lighthouse was lit. This was placed on top of a keepers house made of wood. The lantern came from the deactivated lighthouse on Korsö. The light was a kerosene lamp. In 1931, the now standing tower was built and both the lantern and keepers house were removed. The new tower first ran on acetylene gas, and later was electrified. In 1992, solar power was installed to the lighthouse. It is owned and remote-controlled by the Swedish Maritime Administration.

See also

 List of lighthouses and lightvessels in Sweden

References

External links
 Sjofartsverket  
 The Swedish Lighthouse Society

Buildings and structures in Stockholm County
Islands of Haninge Municipality
Islands of the Stockholm archipelago
Lighthouses in Sweden
Landforms of Stockholm County